Chrystna Bhagascara (born 22 June 1998) is an Indonesian professional footballer who plays as a midfielder for Liga 1 club Persis Solo. Born in Bojonegoro, East Java, Bhagascara is a player who graduated from the ASIFA Academy and became part of the Indonesia U19 squad in the 2016 AFF U-19 Youth Championship.

Club career

Muba Babel United
He was signed for Muba Babel United to play in Liga 2 in the 2019 season. Bhagascara made his league appearance on 23 June 2019, coming on as a starter in a 1–0 loss against Cilegon United at the Krakatau Steel Stadium.

Putra Sinar Giri
He was signed for Putra Sinar Giri to play in Liga 2 in the 2020 season. This season was suspended on 27 March 2020 due to the COVID-19 pandemic. The season was abandoned and was declared void on 20 January 2021.

Persekat Tegal
On 21 April 2021, Bhagascara signed a one-year contract with Liga 2 club Persekat Tegal on a free transfer. He made his league debut for Persekat Tegal when he was part of the starting lineup of a 2021–22 Liga 2 match against Badak Lampung on 27 September, in which Persekat won.

On 5 October, Bhagascara scored his first league goal for Persekat in a 1–2 loss over RANS Cilegon at the Gelora Bung Karno Madya Stadium.

Honours

Club
Persis Solo
 Liga 2: 2021

References

External links
 Chrystna Bhagascara at Soccerway
 Chrystna Bhagascara at Liga Indonesia

1998 births
Living people
Indonesian footballers
Association football midfielders
Persis Solo players